is a metro station on the Toei Mita Line in Itabashi, Tokyo, Japan, operated by Toei Subway.

Lines
Shin-itabashi Station is served by the Toei Mita Line, and is numbered I-17.

Station layout
The station consists of an island platform serving two tracks

History
Shin-itabashi Station opened on 27 December 1968.

Surrounding area
Itabashi Station
The station is close to Itabashi Station on the JR Saikyō Line.
It takes about 5 minutes from here to the station.
Shimo-Itabashi Station
Moreover, the station is also near to Shimo-Itabashi Station on the Tobu Tojo Line.  It takes about 7 minutes from here to the station.
Lycée Français International de Tokyo
The French international school relocated to Takinogawa from Fujimi in 2012.

References

External links

 Shin-itabashi Station information (Toei)

Railway stations in Tokyo
Toei Mita Line
Railway stations in Japan opened in 1968